Ordishia rutilus is a moth of the family Erebidae first described by Stoll in 1781. It is found in Costa Rica, Panama and Suriname.

References

Phaegopterina
Moths described in 1781